Elections were held in Illinois on Tuesday, November 8, 1966.

Primaries were held on June 14, 1966.

Election information
1966 was a midterm election year in the United States.

Turnout
Turnout in the primary was 32.20%, with 1,791,494 ballots cast (1,060,189 Democratic and 731,305 Republican).

Turnout in the general election was 73.54%, with 3,928,478 ballots cast.

Federal elections

United States Senate

Incumbent Senator Paul Douglas, a Democrat seeking a fourth term, was defeated by Republican Charles H. Percy.

United States House 

All 24 Illinois seats in the United States House of Representatives were up for election in 1966.

Republicans flipped one seat, leaving the Illinois House delegation to consist of 12 Democrats and 12 Republicans.

State elections

Treasurer 

Incumbent Treasurer was William J. Scott, a Republican. Democrat Adlai Stevenson III was elected to succeed him in office.

Democratic primary

Republican primary

General election

Superintendent of Public Instruction 

Incumbent  Superintendent of Public Instruction Ray Page, a Republican, won a second term.

Democratic primary

Republican primary

General election

State Senate
Seats in the Illinois Senate were up for election in 1966. Republicans retained control of the chamber.

State House of Representatives
Seats in the Illinois House of Representatives were up for election in 1966. Republicans flipped control of the chamber.

Trustees of University of Illinois

An election was held for three of nine seats for Trustees of University of Illinois. 

The election saw the election of new Republican members Donald R. Grimes, Ralph Crane Hahn, and James A. Weatherly.

Third-term incumbent Democrats Kenney E. Williamson and Frances Best Watkins lost reelection. Incumbent third-term Republican Wayne A. Johnston Sr. was not renominated.

Ballot measures
Three ballot measures were put before voters in 1966. One was a legislatively referred state statute, and two were legislatively referred constitutional amendments.

In order to be approved, legislatively referred state statutes required the support of a majority of those voting on the amendment. In order to be placed on the ballot, proposed legislatively referred constitutional amendments needed to be approved by two-thirds of each house of the Illinois General Assembly. In order to be approved, they required approval of either two-thirds of those voting on the amendment itself or a majority of all ballots cast in the general elections.

County Officers' Re-Election Amendment 
The County Officers' Re-Election Amendment, a legislatively referred constitutional amendment, was put to a vote. It would have amended Section 8 of Article X of the Illinois Constitution. It failed to meet either threshold for passage.

General Banking Law Amendment 
General Banking Law Amendment was approved by voters as a legislatively referred state statute. It modified the state's banking law. To pass, it had required a majority of those voting on the article to approve it.

Revenue Amendment 
The Revenue Amendment, a legislatively referred constitutional amendment, was put to a vote. It would have amended Sections 1, 2, 3, 9, 10, 12, and 13 of Article IX of the Illinois Constitution. It failed to meet either threshold for passage.

Local elections
Local elections were held.

References

 
Illinois